Marc Antonio Carter, commonly known as T. J. Carter (born May 22, 1985) is a former American professional basketball player. He is a 1.92 m (6 ft 3  in) tall shooting guard.

College career
Carter played college basketball at North Carolina-Wilmington, with the UNC Wilmington Seahawks, from 2003 to 2008.

Professional career
Carter began his pro career in the German League with the Düsseldorf Giants in 2008. He then played with the Cypriot League club AEL Limassol. He moved to the German club Phoenix Hagen in 2011.

He next played with the Greek League club Rethymno, before joining the Greek club Panionios in 2013. He moved to the Greek club PAOK in 2014. In June 2015, he signed with AEK Athens.

Carter joined the Polish Stal Ostrów Wielkopolski on November 12, 2016.

On July 22, 2017, Carter signed with Lietuvos rytas Vilnius of the Lithuanian Basketball League, but could not adapt to become a part of head coach Kurtinaitis' tactics, so eventually the contract was terminated by mutual agreement on November 11, 2017.

On December 21, 2017, Carter signed a contract with Stal Ostrów Wielkopolski in Poland.

Statistics

Domestic Leagues

Regular season

|-
| 2012–13
| style="text-align:left;"| Rethymno
| align=left | GBL
| 26 ||  || 23.2 || .514 || .404 || .836 || 3.3 || 1.5 || 1.3 || 0.0 || 11.8
|-
| 2013–14
| style="text-align:left;"| Panionios
| align=left | GBL
| 25 ||  || 24.1 || .423 || .384 || .785 || 3.4 || 1.6 || 0.8 || 0.2 || 9.5
|-
| 2014–15
| style="text-align:left;"| PAOK
| align=left | GBL
| 25 ||  || 29.0 || .426 || .336 || .847 || 4.0 || 2.1 || 1.1 || 0.2 || 12.5
|-
| 2015–16
| style="text-align:left;"| AEK Athens
| align=left | GBL
| 25 ||  || 18.8 || .423 || .346 || .731 || 2.7 || 1.5 || 1.0 || 0.4 || 6.3
|-
| 2017–18
| style="text-align:left;"| Lietuvos rytas
| align=left | LKL
| 8 ||  || 14.6 || .385 || .200 || .875 || 1.5 || 2.6 || 0.8 || 0.4 || 6.1
|}

References

External links
Twitter Account
Basketball-Reference.com Profile
EuroCup Profile
Eurobasket.com Profile
RealGM.com Profile
Draftexpress.com Profile
Greek Basket League Profile 
North Carolina-Wilmington College Profile 
Sports-Reference College Stats
ESPN College Stats

1985 births
Living people
AEK B.C. players
AEL Limassol B.C. players
American expatriate basketball people in Argentina
American expatriate basketball people in Cyprus
American expatriate basketball people in Germany
American expatriate basketball people in Greece
American expatriate basketball people in Lithuania
American expatriate basketball people in Poland
American expatriate basketball people in Romania
American men's basketball players
Basketball players from Maryland
BC Rytas players
CSM Oradea (basketball) players
Panionios B.C. players
P.A.O.K. BC players
People from St. Mary's County, Maryland
Phoenix Hagen players
Quimsa basketball players
Rethymno B.C. players
Shooting guards
Stal Ostrów Wielkopolski players
UNC Wilmington Seahawks men's basketball players